Kim Kwang-seok (1964–1996) is a South Korean folk rock singer.

Kim Gwang-seok or Kim Kwang-sok may also refer to:
Kim Kwang-seok (martial arts) (born 1936)
Kim Gwang-sok (born 1950), North Korean footballer
Kim Gwang-seok (wrestler) (born 1977), South Korean wrestler
Kim Gwang-seok (born 1983), South Korea footballer

See also
Kim Gwang-suk, North Korean gymnast
Kim Kwang-suk, North Korean singer